Salix schwerinii, the narrow-leaf willow,
is a species of willow native to northeastern Asia (from Kolyma to northeastern China). It is a shrub or a tree  m high with long and exceptionally narrow leaves, similar and closely related to Salix viminalis.

References

External links 

 

Flora of Korea
schwerinii